Katherine Matilda Swinton (born 5 November 1960) is a British actress. Known for her roles in independent films and blockbusters, she has received various accolades, including an Academy Award and a British Academy Film Award, in addition to nominations for three Golden Globe Awards and five Screen Actors Guild Awards. In 2020, The New York Times ranked her as one of the greatest actors of the 21st century.

Swinton began her career by appearing in Derek Jarman’s experimental films Caravaggio (1986), The Last of England (1988), War Requiem (1989), and The Garden (1990). Swinton won the Volpi Cup for Best Actress at the Venice Film Festival for her portrayal of Isabella of France in Edward II (1991). She next starred in Sally Potter's Orlando (1992), for which she was nominated for the European Film Award for Best Actress. She was nominated for a Golden Globe Award for her performance in The Deep End (2001), followed with appearances in Vanilla Sky (2001) and Adaptation (2002). For the film Young Adam (2003), Swinton won the British Academy Scotland Award for Best Actress.

Swinton's performance in Michael Clayton (2007) won her the Academy Award for Best Supporting Actress and the BAFTA Award for Best Actress in a Supporting Role. Prior to this, she appeared in the film Constantine (2005), and subsequently had roles in Julia (2008) and I Am Love (2009). She gained acclaim for her performance in Lynne Ramsay's 
psychological thriller We Need to Talk About Kevin (2011) for which she received a nomination for the BAFTA Award for Best Actress in a Leading Role. Swinton gained wider recognition for her portrayals as the White Witch in The Chronicles of Narnia series (2005–2010) and the Ancient One in the Marvel Cinematic Universe franchise. She is also known for her performances in the Wes Anderson films Moonrise Kingdom (2012), The Grand Budapest Hotel (2014) and The French Dispatch (2021).

Swinton was awarded the Richard Harris Award by the British Independent Film Awards in recognition of her contributions to the British film industry. In 2013, she was given a special tribute by the Museum of Modern Art. In 2020, Swinton was awarded the British Film Institute Fellowship for her "daringly eclectic and striking talents as a performer and filmmaker and recognises her great contribution to film culture, independent film exhibition and philanthropy."

Early life
Katherine Matilda Swinton was born on 5 November 1960 in London, the daughter of Judith Balfour (née Killen; 1929–2012) and Sir John Swinton (1925–2018), the Laird of Kimmerghame House. She has three brothers. Her father was a retired major-general in the British Army, and was Lord Lieutenant of Berwickshire from 1989 to 2000. Her mother was Australian. Her paternal great-grandfather was a Scottish politician and herald, George Swinton, and her maternal great-great-grandfather was the Scottish botanist John Hutton Balfour. The Swinton family is an ancient Anglo-Scots family that can trace its lineage to the Middle Ages. Swinton considers herself "first and foremost" a Scot.

Swinton attended three independent schools: Queen's Gate School in London, the West Heath Girls' School, and also Fettes College for a brief period. West Heath was a boarding school, where she was a classmate and friend of Lady Diana Spencer, the future Princess of Wales. As an adult, Swinton has spoken out against boarding schools, stating that West Heath was "a very lonely and isolating environment" and that she thinks boarding schools "are a very cruel setting in which to grow up and I don't feel children benefit from that type of education. Children need their parents and the love parents can provide." Swinton spent two years as a volunteer in South Africa and Kenya before University.

In 1983, Swinton graduated from New Hall at the University of Cambridge with a degree in social and political sciences. While at Cambridge, she joined the Communist Party; she later joined the Scottish Socialist Party. It was in college that Swinton began performing on stage.

Career
Swinton joined the Royal Shakespeare Company in 1984, appearing in Measure for Measure. She also worked with the Traverse Theatre in Edinburgh, starring in Mann ist Mann by Manfred Karge in 1987. On television, she appeared as Julia in the 1986 mini-series Zastrozzi: A Romance based on the Gothic novel by Percy Bysshe Shelley. Her first film was Caravaggio in 1986, directed by Derek Jarman. In 1987, Swinton starred along Bill Paterson in Peter Wollen's Friendship's Death, she played a female extraterrestrial robot on a peace mission to Earth. In 1988, Swinton was a member of the jury at the 38th Berlin International Film Festival.

Swinton went on to star in several Jarman films, including The Last of England (1987), War Requiem (1989) opposite Laurence Olivier, and Edward II (1991), for which she won the Volpi Cup for Best Actress at the 1991 Venice Film Festival. She performed in the performance art piece Volcano Saga by Joan Jonas in 1989. The 28-minute video art piece is based on a 13th-century Icelandic Laxdæla Saga, and it tells a mythological story of a young woman whose dreams tell of the future.

Swinton played the title role in Orlando (1992), Sally Potter's film version of the novel by Virginia Woolf. The part allowed Swinton to explore matters of gender presentation onscreen, which reflected her lifelong interest in androgynous style. Swinton later reflected on the role in an interview accompanied by a striking photo shoot. "People talk about androgyny in all sorts of dull ways," said Swinton, noting that the recent rerelease of Orlando had her thinking again about its pliancy. She referred to 1920s playful, androgynous French artist Claude Cahun: "Cahun looked at the limitlessness of an androgynous gesture, which I've always been interested in."

In 1993, she was a member of the jury at the 18th Moscow International Film Festival. In 1995, with producer Joanna Scanlan, Swinton developed a performance/installation live art piece in the Serpentine Gallery, London, where she was on display to the public for a week, asleep or apparently so, in a glass case, as a piece of performance art. The piece is sometimes incorrectly credited to Cornelia Parker, whom Swinton invited to collaborate for the installation in London. The performance, titled The Maybe, was repeated in 1996 at the Museo Barracco in Rome and in 2013 at the Museum of Modern Art in New York. In 1996, she appeared in the music video for Orbital's "The Box".

Recent years have seen Swinton move toward mainstream projects, including the leading role in the American film The Deep End (2001), in which she played the mother of a gay son she suspects of killing his boyfriend. For this performance, she was nominated for a Golden Globe Award. She appeared as a supporting character in the films The Beach (2000), featuring Leonardo DiCaprio, Vanilla Sky (2001), and as the archangel Gabriel in Constantine. Swinton appeared in the British films The Statement (2003) and Young Adam (2003). For her performance in the latter film, she received the British Academy Scotland Award for Best Actress.

Swinton has collaborated with the fashion designers Viktor & Rolf; she was the focus of their One Woman Show 2003, in which they made all the models look like copies of Swinton, and she read a poem (of her own) that included the line "There is only one you. Only one". In 2005, Swinton performed as the White Witch Jadis, in the film version of The Chronicles of Narnia: The Lion, the Witch and the Wardrobe, and as Audrey Cobb in the Mike Mills film adaptation of the novel Thumbsucker. Swinton later had cameos in Narnias sequels The Chronicles of Narnia: Prince Caspian and The Chronicles of Narnia: The Voyage of the Dawn Treader. In August 2006, she opened the new Screen Academy Scotland production centre in Edinburgh. In 2007, Swinton's performance as Karen Crowder in Michael Clayton earned her both a British Academy Film Award for Best Actress in a Supporting Role as well as the for Academy Award for Best Supporting Actress at the 2008 80th Academy Awards, the film's sole win from the latter association.

In July 2008, Swinton founded the film festival Ballerina Ballroom Cinema of Dreams. The event took place in a ballroom in Nairn on Scotland's Moray Firth in August. Swinton next appeared in the 2008 Coen Brothers film Burn After Reading. She was cast in the role of Elizabeth Abbott in The Curious Case of Benjamin Button, alongside Cate Blanchett and Brad Pitt. She collaborated with artist Patrick Wolf on his 2009 album The Bachelor, contributing four spoken word pieces. Also in 2009, she and Mark Cousins embarked on a project where they mounted a 33.5-tonne portable cinema on a large truck, hauling it manually through the Scottish Highlands, creating a travelling independent film festival. The project was featured prominently in a documentary titled Cinema Is Everywhere. The festival was repeated in 2011.

She had a starring role as the eponymous character in Erick Zonca's Julia, which premiered at the 2008 Berlin International Film Festival and saw a U.S. release in May 2009. She starred in the film adaptation of the novel We Need to Talk About Kevin, released in October 2011. She portrayed the mother of the title character, a teenage boy who commits a high school massacre. In 2012, she was cast in Jim Jarmusch's Only Lovers Left Alive. The film premiered at the Cannes Film Festival on 23 May 2013, and was released in the U.S. in the first half of 2014. She played Mason in the 2014 sci-fi film Snowpiercer. Also in 2012, Swinton appeared in Doug Aitken's SONG 1, an outdoor video installation created for the Hirshhorn Museum and Sculpture Garden in Washington, D.C. In November of the same year, she and Sandro Kopp made cameo appearances in episode 6 of the BBC comedy Getting On.

She co-founded Drumduan Upper School in Findhorn, Scotland in 2013 with Ian Sutherland McCook. Swinton and McCook both had children who attended the Moray Steiner School, whose students graduate at age 14. They founded Drumduan partly to allow their children to continue their Steiner educations with neither grading nor tests. Swinton resigned as a director of Drumduan in April 2019.

In February 2013, she played the part of David Bowie's wife in the promotional video for his song "The Stars (Are Out Tonight)", directed by Floria Sigismondi. In 2013, she was named as one of the 50 best-dressed over 50 by The Guardian. In 2015, she starred in Luca Guadagnino's thriller A Bigger Splash, opposite Dakota Johnson, Matthias Schoenaerts and Ralph Fiennes. Also in 2015, she played Dianne, Amy Schumer's character's editor on S'Nuff Magazine, in Trainwreck.

Swinton portrayed the Ancient One in the Marvel Cinematic Universe, appearing in the 2016 film Doctor Strange and the 2019 film Avengers: Endgame. Swinton starred in Luca Guadagnino's 2018 remake of the horror film Suspiria. She played several roles, and was credited as Lutz Ebersdorf. She was ranked one of the best dressed women in 2018 by fashion website Net-a-Porter. In 2021, Swinton starred as newspaper writer J.K.L. Berensen in the Wes Anderson anthology film The French Dispatch, and as Jessica Holland in Apichatpong Weerasethakul's first English-language film, Memoria.

Personal life
Although born in London and having attended various schools in England, Swinton describes her nationality as Scottish, citing her childhood, growing up in Scotland and Scottish aristocratic family background. In 1997, Swinton gave birth to twins,  Honor and Xavier Swinton Byrne, with her then-partner John Byrne, a Scottish artist and playwright. She has lived in Scotland for over two decades, currently in Nairn, overlooking the Moray Firth in the Highland region of Scotland, with her children and partner Sandro Kopp, a German painter, with whom she has been in a relationship since 2004.

Swinton signed a petition in support of director Roman Polanski, who had been detained while traveling to a film festival in relation to his 1977 sexual abuse charges, which the petition argued would undermine the tradition of film festivals as a place for works to be shown "freely and safely", and that arresting filmmakers traveling to neutral countries could open the door "for actions of which no-one can know the effects." In 2018, Swinton stated her support for Scottish independence.

In a 2021 interview with Vogue, Swinton mentioned that she identifies as queer. She was quoted as saying, "I'm very clear that queer is actually, for me anyway, to do with sensibility. I always felt I was queer – I was just looking for my queer circus, and I found it. And having found it, it's my world." She further stated that her collaborations with several creative visionaries helped her to find a sense of familiar belonging. In a 2022 profile by The Guardian, she stated, "It just so happened I'd also been a queer kid – not in terms of my sexual life, just odd."

In January 2022, Swinton revealed she is recovering from long COVID, with symptoms including having trouble getting out of bed, a bad cough, vertigo, and memory issues; she is also considering quitting acting to "retrain as a palliative carer", informed both by the trauma of living through the AIDS epidemic in the UK – Swinton mentions feeling a similarity between her experiences and those of the characters in Russell T Davies' 2021 TV drama miniseries It's a Sin – and "witnessing the loving support her parents received from professional carers at the end of their lives, and the impact it had on her."

Filmography and accolades 

Swinton has amassed a prolific list of credits, including over sixty film roles and a dozen television appearances.

Throughout her career, Swinton has also received several accolades, including the Academy Award for Best Supporting Actress, the British Academy Scotland Award for Best Actress, the British Academy Film Award for Best Actress in a Supporting Role, the European Film Award for Best Actress, the National Board of Review Award for Best Actress, two Saturn Awards for Best Supporting Actress, and the Volpi Cup for Best Actress, in addition to nominations for five Critics' Choice Awards, three Golden Globe Awards and five Screen Actors Guild Awards.

In 2020, Swinton was awarded the British Film Institute Fellowship for her "daringly eclectic and striking talents as a performer and filmmaker and recognises her great contribution to film culture, independent film exhibition and philanthropy." Also in 2020, The New York Times ranked her thirteenth on its list of "The Greatest Actors of the 21st Century".

In November 2022, she was presented with the 2022 FIAF Award "for her work on the preservation and promotion of archive film, film history and women's role in it".

Notes

References

External links

 
 BFI: Tilda Swinton
 Tilda Swinton Online - All things Tilda
 Tilda Swinton: A Life in Pictures, BAFTA webcast, 27 November 2007

1960 births
Living people
20th-century English actresses
21st-century English actresses
20th-century Scottish actresses
21st-century Scottish actresses
Actresses from London
Alumni of New Hall, Cambridge
Anglo-Scots
Audiobook narrators
Best Supporting Actress BAFTA Award winners
Best Supporting Actress Academy Award winners
British Shakespearean actresses
Communist Party of Great Britain members
David di Donatello winners
European Film Award for Best Actress winners
English film actresses
English people of Australian descent
English people of Scottish descent
English television actresses
Scottish film actresses
Scottish people of English descent
Scottish people of Australian descent
Scottish television actresses
People educated at Fettes College
People educated at Queen's Gate School
Royal Shakespeare Company members
Volpi Cup for Best Actress winners
Queer actresses
Queer women
Androgynous people